The Secrets of Berlin is a 1921 German silent film directed by Arthur Teuber and starring Evi Eva, Dora Bergner and Carl Geppert. It was released in four parts.

The film's sets were designed by the art director Willi A. Herrmann.

Cast
 Evi Eva as Die "blonde Else"
 Dora Bergner as Fürstin Steinegg
 Grete Berger
 Lilly Eisenlohr
 Carl Geppert
 Max Grünberg
 Willy Kaiser-Heyl
 Hellmut Kraus
 Josef Rehberger

References

Bibliography
 Rainey, Buck. Serials and Series: A World Filmography, 1912–1956. McFarland, 2015.

External links

1921 films
Films of the Weimar Republic
German silent feature films
Films directed by Arthur Teuber
German black-and-white films
1920s German films